Dropbear is a software package written by Matt Johnston that provides a Secure Shell-compatible server and client. It is designed as a replacement for standard OpenSSH for environments with low memory and processor resources, such as embedded systems. It is a core component of OpenWrt and other router distributions.

Dropbear was originally released in April 2003.

Technology 
Dropbear implements version 2 of the Secure Shell (SSH) protocol.

The cryptographic algorithms are implemented using third-party cryptographic libraries like LibTomCrypt  included internally in the Dropbear distribution. It derives some parts from OpenSSH to handle BSD-style pseudo terminals.

Features 
Dropbear implements the complete SSH version 2 protocol in both the client and the server. It does not support SSH version 1 backwards-compatibility in order to save space and resources, and to avoid the inherent security vulnerabilities in SSH version 1. SCP is also implemented. SFTP support relies on a binary file which can be provided by OpenSSH or similar programs. FISH works in any case and is supported by Konqueror. 

Dropbear supports elliptic curve cryptography for key exchange, as of version 2013.61test and beyond.

See also 

 Lsh – GNU Project's implementation of ssh
 Comparison of SSH clients
 Comparison of SSH servers

References

External links
 

Cryptographic software
Free network-related software
Free security software
Secure Shell
Software using the MIT license
Free software programmed in C